The California Central Coast is an area roughly spanning the area between the Monterey Bay extending through Santa Cruz County, San Benito County, Monterey County, San Luis Obispo County, Santa Barbara County and Ventura County.

This is a list of museums, defined for this context as institutions (including nonprofit organizations, government entities, and private businesses) that collect and care for objects of cultural, artistic, scientific, or historical interest and make their collections or related exhibits available for public viewing. Also included are non-profit and university art galleries. Museums that exist only in cyberspace (i.e., virtual museums) are not included.

To use the sortable tables: click on the icons at the top of each column to sort that column in alphabetical order; click again for reverse alphabetical order.

Museums

Defunct museums
 Chandler Vintage Museum of Transportation and Wildlife, Oxnard, collections sold in 2006
 Perry-Downer House and Costume Gallery, Monterey, private house since 2010

References

External links
 California State Association of Counties (CSAC)

Central Coast